Murjek is a village situated in Jokkmokk Municipality, Norrbotten County, Sweden with 83 inhabitants in 2005.

The village is a popular train stop for hikers and tourists, as buses to Kvikkjokk go from Murjek. Kvikkjokk is a common starting point for hikes into Sarek National Park.

References 

Populated places in Jokkmokk Municipality
Lapland (Sweden)